Dalima Chhibber (born 30 August 1997) is an Indian professional footballer who plays as a defender for Manitoba Bisons and Indian national team.

Early life
Dalima was born in a football-loving family, as both of her parents were soccer players, and her dad made it pro, as did her sister and her brother. She joined her father Om Chhibber's football academy Eves Soccer Club at the age of 7 and eventually went on to play for the Indian women's youth teams. She did her graduation from the Jesus and Mary College of the Delhi University. She is pursuing her Masters in Sports Psychology at the University of Manitoba where she is also a part of the women's soccer team of Manitoba Bisons. She completed her graduation in November 2022.

Club career
Dalima played for FC Pune City in 2016-17 Indian Women's League season and then moved to India Rush SC for the 2017–18 Indian Women's League season. She joined Gokulam Kerala FC on 31 March 2019 for the 2019–20 Indian Women's League season.

On 14 August 2019, Dalima joined Manitoba Bisons in Canadian West Universities Premier Division. After two-year long stint and experience with Gokulam Kerala, Chhibber moved back to Canadian side Manitoba Bisons in August 2022.

International career
Dalima made her international debut in 2016 South Asian games against Maldives. After that she became a regular choice for the national team. She scored her first goal in 2019 SAFF Women's Championship against Bangladesh on 20 March 2019. Her second goal came against Nepal, a 40 yard freekick in the final of the SAFF Championship. For her prolific performance in 2019 SAFF Women's Championship she was awarded the Most Valuable Player of the Tournament Award.

International goals

Honours 
India
 SAFF Women's Championship: 2016, 2019
 South Asian Games Gold Medal: 2016

Gokulam Kerala
Indian Women's League: 2021–22
AFC Women's Club Championship: third place 2021

Individual
2019 SAFF Women's Championship Most Valuable Player

See also
 List of Indian football players in foreign leagues

References

External links 
 Dalima Chhibber at All India Football Federation
 

Living people
1997 births
Indian women's footballers
India women's international footballers
India women's youth international footballers
Footballers from Delhi
Women's association football defenders
South Asian Games gold medalists for India
Expatriate women's soccer players in Canada
Indian expatriate women's footballers
Indian expatriate sportspeople in Canada
South Asian Games medalists in football
Gokulam Kerala FC Women players
Indian Women's League players
Delhi University alumni
University of Manitoba alumni
Manitoba Bisons soccer players